Fröjel is a populated area, a socken (not to be confused with parish), on the Swedish island of Gotland. It comprises the same area as the administrative Fröjel District, established on 1January 2016. In 2014, it had a population of 358.

Geography 
Fröjel is situated on the west coast of Gotland. The medieval Fröjel Church is in Fröjel. , Fröjel Church belongs to Fröjel parish in Klinte pastorat.

One of the asteroids in the main belt, 10127 Fröjel, is named after this place.

See also 
 Fröjel Formation

References

External links 

Objects from Fröjel at the Digital Museum by Nordic Museum

Populated places in Gotland County